Tango Charlie is a 2005 Indian Hindi-language war film written and directed by Mani Shankar and cinematography is by T. Surendra Reddy. The film stars Ajay Devgn, Bobby Deol, Sanjay Dutt, Sunil Shetty, Tanisha, Nandana Sen and Sudesh Berry. The film follows paramilitary man Tarun Chauhan's (Bobby Deol) journey from young border guard recruit to war-hardened fighter in the Indian Border Security Force. This movie was banned for release in Assam for allegedly defaming Bodo community of Northeast India.

Plot 

The story starts off with two Indian Air Force helicopter pilots (Squadron Leader Vikram Rathore and Flight Lieutenant Shezad Khan, played by Sanjay Dutt and Sunil Shetty respectively) discovering a mass pile of dead terrorists and an Indian trooper appearing to be dead in the Kashmir valley. They later discover that he's alive and find out who he is after reading his diary.

Insurgency in the North East 

The tale revolves around an Indian Border Security Force trooper named Tarun Chauhan (Bobby Deol) in the 101st BSF Battalion arriving in Manipur. The jungle is full of Bodo rebels. While walking through the jungle searching for his platoon commander, he was caught in a trap and hung upside down. It is later revealed that Havaldar (Sergeant) Mohammad Ali (Ajay Devgn) set the trap and calls him an "idiot" for falling into it. He meets the rest of the squad where he gets his job as platoon cook. On being asked why he joined the Border Security Force, he says it is to protect his country from any harm. Havaldar Ali says that whoever has made that comment is nothing but a hypocrite. He tells him that the rebels have massacred many innocent people and are not afraid to kill them as well. Chauhan later acknowledges his codename "Tango Charlie" and learns Havaldar Ali's codename is "Mike Alpha."

One day on a patrol, the platoon accidentally kills one of their own as a set trap by the rebels. The entire platoon goes mad with grief over this mistake. Then another young soldier is kidnapped and has his stomach sliced open and is left as bait. Chauhan finds this shocking and totally unbelievable. Havaldar Ali tells his overly emotional troopers to think that he's dead and focus on killing the rebels. The dying soldier continues to scream in pain. Chauhan tries to stop one of the overly emotional soldiers from giving the wounded soldier morphine. Another member of the platoon falls into the trap and is shot dead. The screaming soldier then dies. Their platoon is finished. Chauhan and Mike Alpha (Havaldar Ali) take aim and fire. They kill most of the rebels but others, as well as their leader, escape.

At night, Chauhan and Havaldar Ali search for the remaining rebels and kill them off one by one. When the leader tries to escape by boat, both of them swim over and knock them off. They engage in hand-to-hand combat; Mike Alpha slits the throat of the rebels leader with his own machete. Chauhan tries to kill the other rebel but finds out that it's a young boy. He holds a knife to his face.

Tarun Chauhan returns home to his native state of Haryana. He is happily welcomed home by his family and friends. He finds out that he's going to be engaged to Lachchi Narayan (Tanisha), an educated computer engineer. Chauhan has beliefs about her views, but they are changed by her. They fall in love, and Chauhan pledges that he will come back to her alive.

Fighting Maoists in Telangana  

A few months later Chauhan and the rest of Mike Alpha's platoon are transferred to the state of Telangana to counter the Maoists separatists wreaking havoc on the countryside. Platoon are riding in a convoy while protecting a high-ranking colonel's wife and young children. As the convoy approaches the city of Hyderabad, the rebels notice it and signal one of their own. He then presses the detonator and sets off a planted IED under the jeep, killing the colonel and his family. They fire on the trucks, causing Mike Alpha's platoon to take cover in a rocky part beside the road while the rebels hunt them down. They use an RPG launcher to flush out the troopers but fail. Chauhan and the rest of the platoon kill the rebels. Chauhan chases a rebel; another BSF trooper attempts to rape her. Chauhan intervenes by pulling him off. He then sees the rebel kill herself with her own assault rifle. The other BSF trooper tries to kill Chauhan for his intervention but he kills him in self-defense. Mike Alpha discovers the whole thing and Chauhan tries to surrender himself saying that he's willing to give into any punishment given to him. Mike Alpha says he did the right thing.

Riots in Gujarat 

On their next assignment, he is surprised to know that the platoon will now try to quell the riots taking place in the western province of Gujarat. Upon arriving at the chaotic scene, the police chief desperately tries to calm the crowd. When he is shot and killed by an extremist, Mike Alpha (Havaldar Mohammed Ali) orders the platoon to open fire. Many innocent people are killed in the volley. Chauhan spots the extremist and tries to shoot him. He accidentally hits a bystander who pops into the way.

After the chaos, Chauhan goes to the victim's family for forgiveness. Instead of forgiving him, they nearly beat him to death even after he tells them that it was a mistake. Mike Alpha intervenes and tells them that the BSF isn't here to kill innocent people but to stop people from committing acts of violence. While in a military hospital, Havaldar Ali tells his own tragic story in which he was assigned to save the family of a rich landlord from Naxalites in Bengal. The terrorists were able to kill almost everyone at the landlord's daughter's wedding. Even with all the effort, he and his group miserably failed; the daughter was killed by the terrorists before he finished them off. He claims it was the first time that he listened to his heart and not his mind.

Chauhan gets a letter saying that Lachchi Narayan is marrying someone else. He dashes home and realises that it was a trap set by her to see how much he loved her. The next day she steals his diary and reads it. She is shocked by the events Chauhan had witnessed. She apologises and they are soon married.

In Kashmir 

The Kargil conflict between India and Pakistan begins again. Mike Alpha's platoon and the battalion move out to Kashmir where they are assigned to defend a bridge. Mike Alpha gives Chauhan a strict order: Shoot anyone who doesn't say a password after three tries. The platoon also undergoes a drill for this situation daily.

One day a high-ranking military officer comes to the bridge; he doesn't know the password ( the password is "Rainfall"). Chauhan shoots one of the guards which enrages the officer who threatens him with a court martial. The officer tries to kill him, and Mike Alpha intervenes. The officer is a disguised  Pakistani soldier. Chauhan takes cover while the Pakistanis kill  most of the platoon. Mike Alpha kills a large number of the Pakistani soldiers and is  severely wounded before being approached by a real battalion of soldiers who give him the password. Mike Alpha salutes them and then dies of his severe wounds. Chauhan vows revenge. He arms himself to the teeth and stalks the Pakistanis to their base. He wires the place with explosives. The Pakistani leader discovers one of the explosive attachments and tries to stop one of his men. Unfortunately he opens the door and the explosives go off, killing the rest of the Pakistanis. Chauhan then goes into the Pakistani leader's place and shoots him dead before being wounded. He collapses into the snow.

He's rescued by the helicopter pilots featured earlier in the film who take him to a village doctor who treats his wounds. Later the pilots are rewarded for their actions in finding Tango Charlie. His dead friend and mentor Havaldar Ali gets rewarded with the Ashok Chakra for his bravery.

Cast 
 Bobby Deol as BSF Soldier Sepoy Tarun Chauhan (Tango Charlie)
 Ajay Devgan as BSF Soldier Hawaldar Mohammad Ali (Mike Alpha) 
 Sudesh Berry as BSF Soldier Bhiku
 Shahbaz Khan as BSF Soldier Dev Dixit
 Rajesh Khera as BSF Soldier Constable Sangram Singh
 Suresh Ghera as Manipur BSF Officer
 Sanjay Dutt as Squadron Leader Vikram Rathore
 Suniel Shetty as Flight Lieutenant Shezad Khan
 Alok Nath as Mr. Anand Chauhan Tarun Chauhan's father
 Ayesha Jaleel as Mrs Chauhan Tarun Chauhan's mother
 Vivek Shauq as Abhay, Tarun's friend
 Sanjay Mishra as Tarun's friend
 Tanisha as Lachchi Narayan / Lachchi Tarun Chauhan
 Tiku Talsania as Ram Narayan (Lachchi's father)
 Nandana Sen as Shyamoli, the daughter of the Bengali landlord
 Kelly Dorji as Bodo people militant leader
 Arun Behll as Bodo militant
 Anjan Srivastav as Doctor
 Mukesh Tiwari as Pakistani Army Fidayeen Leader
 Rajendranath Zutshi as Bengali Naxal leader
 Subrat Dutta as Naxal leader's henchman
 Abhijit Lahiri as Landlord Rai Bahadur
 Atul Mongia as Pakistani Army Soldier Aslam Jehangir
 Pabitra Rabha as Bodo militant group deputy

Soundtrack 
The music for the movie was mainly composed by Anu Malik.

Release and reception

Critical reception 
The film deals with insurgency and extremism in various parts of India, and was described by BBC's Jaspreet Pandohar as "an interesting study of terrorism, violence, and valour". The Hindu newspaper called the film "a visual treat with a daring theme" and "dares to enter where the Indian media shies away".

References

External links 

 
 BBC Review – Tango Charlie (2005)

2005 films
War adventure films
2000s Hindi-language films
2000s war drama films
Films about terrorism in India
Indian war drama films
Films shot in Jammu and Kashmir
Films set in Jammu and Kashmir
Films set in the 1990s
Kargil War
Anti-war films
Non-Assamese-language films with Assamese connection
Films scored by Anu Malik
Films scored by Anand Raj Anand
Indian Army in films
Films set in Gujarat
Films set in Andhra Pradesh
Films about Naxalism
Films set in West Bengal
2000s political drama films
Kashmir conflict in films
Films about insurgency in Northeast India
Indian Air Force in films
Films set in Kargil
2005 drama films
Films directed by Mani Shankar